Johnson House may refer to:

United Kingdom
Dr. Johnson's House, 17 Gough Square, London

United States

Alabama
John Johnson House (Leighton, Alabama)

Arkansas
 Johnson House (514 East 8th Street, Little Rock, Arkansas)
 Johnson House (516 East 8th Street, Little Rock, Arkansas)
 Johnson House (518 East 8th Street, Little Rock, Arkansas)
 Johnson House (Pine Bluff, Arkansas)
Johnson House and Mill, Johnson

California
 Johnson House, Old Town San Diego

Connecticut
Philip Johnson Glass House, New Canaan, Connecticut

Delaware
William Julius "Judy" Johnson House, Marshallton
Johnson-Morris House, Newark vicinity

Florida
C. L. Johnson House, Lake Wales
Johnson-Wolff House, Tampa

Idaho
John G. Johnson (Rintakangas) Homestead, Lake Fork, listed on the National Register of Historic Places (NRHP)
John S. Johnson (Sampila) Homestead, Lake Fork, listed on the NRHP

Iowa
George Johnson House (Calamus, Iowa)
William A. and Ida C. Johnson House, Oskaloosa

Kansas
 Johnson House (Lindsborg, Kansas)

Kentucky
 Ben Johnson House (Bardstown, Kentucky)
 Ben Johnson House (Flemingsburg Junction, Kentucky), listed on the NRHP

Louisiana
 Johnson House (Mandeville, Louisiana), listed on the NRHP

Massachusetts
 Johnson House (Methuen, Massachusetts)
John and Edward Johnson Three-Decker, Worcester
John Johnson Three-Decker, Worcester

Michigan
Abner C. Johnson House, Flint

Minnesota
John B. Johnson House, Osakis, listed on the NRHP
John A. Johnson House, St. Peter, listed on the NRHP

Mississippi
William Johnson House (Natchez, Mississippi)

Missouri
George Johnson House (Lexington, Missouri)

Montana
 Johnson House (Bozeman, Montana), listed on the NRHP

New Jersey
Johnson Hall (Salem)
William H. Johnson House, New Brunswick

New York
 Johnson House (Cape Vincent, New York)

North Carolina
John Hiram Johnson House, Saluda

Oklahoma
 Johnson House (Chandler, Oklahoma)

Pennsylvania
John Johnson House (Philadelphia, Pennsylvania)

South Dakota
William Johnson House (Fruitdale, South Dakota)

Tennessee
William W. Johnson House, Franklin
Andrew Johnson National Historic Site, Greeneville

Texas
John Johnson House (McKinney, Texas), listed on the NRHP
 Johnson House (San Marcos, Texas), listed on the NRHP

Utah
William Derby Johnson, Jr., House, Kanab, listed on the NRHP
David and Hattie S. Rasmuson Johnson House, Sandy, listed on the NRHP
John A. and Annie C. Olsen Johnson House, Sandy, listed on the NRHP
Mont and Harriet Johnson House, Springville

Vermont
 Johnson House (University of Vermont), Burlington

Washington
 Johnson House (Nordland, Washington), listed on the NRHP
 Johnson House (Yelm, Washington), listed on the NRHP

Wisconsin
 A.P. Johnson House, Delavan
 Iverson-Johnson House, Stoughton

See also
John Johnson House (disambiguation)
George Johnson House (disambiguation)
Ben Johnson House (disambiguation)
William Johnson House (disambiguation)
Johnson Hall (disambiguation)
Johnson Farm (disambiguation)
Johnson Barn (disambiguation)